Angela Dawson (born 14 January 1968) is a British sprint canoer who competed in the late 1980s. She was eliminated in the semifinals of the K-4 500 m event at the 1988 Summer Olympics in Seoul.

References
Sports-reference.com profile

1968 births
Canoeists at the 1988 Summer Olympics
Living people
Olympic canoeists of Great Britain
British female canoeists